Mudar ibn Nizar is the traditional eponymous ancestor of the Mudar, one of the most powerful northern Arab tribal groupings.

History 
The tradition states that Muhammad was the son of 'Abdullah, b. 'Abdu'I-Muttalib (whose name
was Shayba), b. Hashim (whose name was 'Amr), b. Abd Manaf (whose
name was al-Mughira), b. Qusay (whose name was Zayd), b. Kilab, b.
Murrah, b. Ka'b, b. Lu'ayy, b. Ghalib, b. Fihr, b. Malik, b. al-Nadr, b.
Kinana, b. Khuzayma, b. Mudrika (whose name was 'Amir), b. Ilyas,
b. Mudar, b. Nizar, b. Ma'add, b. Adnan, b. Udd (or Udad),.... b. Qedar, b. Isma'il, b. Ibrahim, the friend of the Compassionate.

Ancestor
According to the Arab genealogists, Mudar was the son of Nizar ibn Ma'ad ibn Adnan by Sawda bint Akk ibn Adnan. He had one full brother, Iyad, and two half-brothers, Rabi'a (who gave his name to the other major tribal grouping) and Anmar. A well-known story is told of how the brothers divided their heritage after their father's death, resulting in Mudar gaining the epithet "the Red" (al-ḥamrāʿ) because he received his father's red tent.

Mudar settled in Mecca, and was buried in al-Rawha, where his tomb became a site of pilgrimage in later centuries. Mudar had two sons: al-Yas or Ilyas, and Aylan al-Nas. Through his sons, Ilyas was the ancestor of the Banu Hudhayl, Banu Asad, Banu Tamim, and Banu Kinana—which includes the Quraysh, the tribe of Muhammad and the early caliphs—while Aylan was the ancestor of the Qays tribes).

The Mudar and Rabi'a are recorded in central Arabia in the Arabic histories of the pre-Islamic period; the kings of the Kindah bore the title of "king of the Ma'ad (or Mudar) and Rabi'a", and they played a role in the conflicts with the Yemeni (southern Arab) tribes.

References

Sources
 

Adnanites
Ancient Arabs
Ancestors of Muhammad